Albums in Belgium are certified since 1995 by Belgian Entertainment Association. From 1995 to May 2007, gold/platinum levels for domestic albums were 15,000/30,000 while for international album 25,000/50,000. Since May 2007 to today gold/platinum domestic levels are 10,000/20,000 while international gold/platinum levels are 15,000/30,000. Ever since July 2017 gold level is 10,000 and platinum 20,000.

Best-selling albums of all-time in Belgium

References

Belgium